George Jones Sings the Great Songs of Leon Payne is an album by American country music artist George Jones, released in 1971 on the Musicor Records label containing nine Leon Payne covers and one Jones co-write with Payne, "Take Me". Eight of the ten songs on this album had been released on earlier Jones albums.  Of those eight, three were re-recorded in 1970 and included here, and the other five are just re-releases of the original 1960s recordings.  The two previously unreleased songs, "Brothers of a Bottle" and "Lifetime to Regret", were also recorded in 1970. This was the last Jones "studio" album that was released by Musicor as he had already signed with Epic Records.

Background
Leon Payne was a honky tonk songwriter who only had one chart hit, the sentimental "I Love You Because", but composed a slew of hits for other artists, most notably "Lost Highway" and "They'll Never Take Her Love from Me" for country music icon Hank Williams.  Jones had been recording Payne's songs since his early days on Mercury Records and this collection, which features nine songs written solely by Payne, would be his last for Musicor (Jones recorded a similar album called Sings the Songs of Dallas Frazier in 1968 with similar artwork).

"Things Have Gone To Pieces" had been a top ten hit for Jones in 1965.

There are some sources that have incorrectly cited Jones as the songwriter of "Brothers of a Bottle", but Leon Payne wrote and recorded this song as a single in 1959.

Reception
The album, which features some of Payne's more obscure songs, reached number 26 on the country albums chart.  Stephen Thomas Erlewine of AllMusic calls the album one of the finest minor gems in the Possum's catalogue:  "From ballads like "Blue Side of Lonesome" to uptempo honky tonkers like "Brothers of a Bottle," all of the cuts on The Great Songs of Leon Payne are first-rate and Jones brings each of them to life."

Track listing
All songs written by Leon Payne, except for the co-write with George Jones on "Take Me".

"They'll Never Take Her Love from Me" – 2:40 (re-recorded 11/16/70)
"Brothers of a Bottle" – 2:48 (previously unreleased – recorded 9/22/70)
"Blue Side of Lonesome" – 2:45 (original 1966 Love Bug album version)
"There's No Justice" – 2:32 (re-recorded 9/22/70)
"With Half a Heart" – 2:22 (re-recorded 9/21/70)
"Lifetime to Regret" – 2:47 (previously unreleased – recorded 11/16/70)
"Let a Little Loving Come In" – 2:21 (original 1965 Mr. Country & Western Music album version)
"Take Me" (Payne, George Jones) – 2:46 (original 1965 New Country Hits album version)
"The Selfishness in Man" – 2:45  (original 1965 Mr. Country & Western Music album version)
"Things Have Gone to Pieces" – 2:55 (original 1965 For the First Time! Two Great Stars - George Jones and Gene Pitney album version)

External links
George Jones' Official Website

References 

1971 albums
George Jones albums
Musicor Records albums